Cranial kinesis is the term for significant movement of skull bones relative to each other in addition to movement at the joint between the upper and lower jaw.  It is usually taken to mean relative movement between the upper jaw and the braincase.

Most vertebrates have some form of kinetic skull. Cranial kinesis, or lack thereof, is usually linked to feeding.  Animals which must exert powerful bite forces, such as crocodiles, often have rigid skulls with little or no kinesis, for maximum strength.  Animals which swallow large prey whole (snakes), which grip awkwardly shaped food items (parrots eating nuts), or, most often, which feed in the water via suction feeding often have very kinetic skulls, frequently with numerous mobile joints. In the case of mammals, which have akinetic skulls (except for perhaps hares), the lack of kinesis is most likely to be related to the secondary palate, which prevents relative movement. This in turn is a consequence of the need to be able to create a suction during suckling.

Ancestry also plays a role in limiting or enabling cranial kinesis.  Significant cranial kinesis is rare in mammals (the human skull shows no cranial kinesis at all).  Birds have varying degrees of cranial kinesis, with parrots exhibiting the greatest degree.  Among reptiles, crocodilians and turtles lack cranial kinesis, while lizards possess some, often minor, degree of kinesis and snakes possessing the most exceptional cranial kinesis of any tetrapod.  In amphibians, cranial kinesis varies, but has yet to be observed in frogs and is rare in salamanders.  Almost all fish have highly kinetic skulls, and teleost fish have developed the most kinetic skulls of any living organism.

Joints are often simple syndesmosis joints, but in some organisms, some joints may be synovial, permitting a greater range of movement.

Types of kinesis
Versluys (1910, 1912, 1936) classified types of cranial kinesis based on the location of the joint in the dorsal part of the skull.
 Metakinesis is jointing between the dermatocranium and occipital segment
 Mesokinesis is jointing more rostral in the skull.
Hofer (1949) further partitioned mesokinesis into
 Mesokinesis proper, which occurs within the braincase (the frontoparietal joint), e.g., many lizards
 Prokinesis, which occurs between the braincase and facial skeleton (the nasofrontal joint, or within the nasals), e.g. birds.
Streptostyly is the fore-aft movement of the quadrate about the otic joint (quadratosquamosal joint), although transverse movements may also be  possible. Many hypothesized types of kinesis require basal joint kinesis (neurokinesis of Iordansky, 1990), that is, movement between the braincase and palate at the basipterygoid joint.

Fish

The first example of cranial kinesis was in the chondrichthyans, such as sharks. There is no attachment between the hyomandibular and the quadrate, and instead the hyoid arch suspends the two sets of jaws like pendulums. This allows sharks to swing their jaws outwards and forwards over the prey, allowing the synchronous meeting of the jaws and avoiding deflecting the prey when it comes close.

Actinopterygian fish 
Actinopterygii (ray finned fish) possess a huge range of kinetic mechanisms. As a general trend through phylogenetic trees, there is a tendency to liberate more and more bony elements to allow greater skull motility. Most actinopts use kinesis to rapidly expand their buccal cavity, to create suction for suction feeding.

Sarcopterygian fish 
Early Dipnoi (lungfishes) had upper jaws fused to their braincase, which implies feeding on hard substrates. Many crossopterygian fishes had kinesis also.

Amphibians

Early tetrapods inherited much of their suction feeding ability from their crossopterygian ancestors. The skulls of modern Lissamphibians are greatly simplified, with many bones fused or otherwise reduced. They have mobility in the premaxilla of the snout, allowing amphibians to open and close their nasal openings. In caecilians, the gap between the parietal bone and squamosal bone enables the skull to bend, which aids the animal in burrowing. Caecilians are the only extant amphibian known to exhibit streptostyly, and their quadrate bone moves even after death.

Modern reptiles

Different groups of reptiles exhibit varying degrees of cranial kinesis, ranging from akinetic, meaning there is very little movement between skull bones, to highly kinetic.

Crocodilians 
Alligators and crocodiles possess highly sutured (or akinetic) skulls. This is thought to allow them to have a stronger bite.

Lizards 
Three forms of cranial kinesis exist within lizards: metakinesis, mesokinesis, and streptostyly.

 Metakinesis - Movement of the skeletal braincase relative to the rest of the skull
 Mesokinesis - Movement of the front portion of the skull relative to the back portion of the skull. The hinge where the movement occurs is present at the frontal-parietal suture.
 Streptostyly - Movement of the quadrate, where it moves in a back and forth motion, allowing the jaw to swing backwards and forwards.

Different lizards possess different degrees of kinesis, with chameleons, agamids, phrynosomatids, and amphisbaenians possessing the least kinetic skulls.

Snakes 

Snakes use highly kinetic joints to allow a huge gape; it is these highly kinetic joints that allow the wide gape and not the "unhinging" of joints, as many believe. Snakes engage in high amounts of cranial kinesis that help them perform important tasks such as eating. Studies done in cottonmouth snakes suggests that the process of eating, as it relates to movement of the cranial bones, can be situated into three parts: hold, advance, and close. The phases document the ways in which the cranial bones shift according to the action being performed on the prey, specifically when the prey is passing through the gape. Similarly observed in the banded water snake, a prey's height acts on the maxillary and quadrate bones of the snake's skull by displacing them in a way that allows for the prey to enter the mouth more smoothly.

Tuatara 
The tuatara possesses an akinetic skull. Some researchers think that juvenile tuatara may have somewhat kinetic skulls, and the bones only fuse later in adults.

Dinosaurs
The three principle types of kinesis found in Dinosaurs are,
 Streptostyly; forwards and back movement of the quadrate, seen in most lizards, snakes and birds. In dinosaurs, this is seen in Ankylosaurs, and possibly in many theropods, such as  Carnotaurus,Coelophysis, and Allosaurus. It is also seen in  Hypsilophodon and Massospondylus.
 Metakinesis; jointing between the neurocranium and the dermatocranium, seen in some lizards. Dromaeosaurus and also Hypsilophodon shows a metakinetic joint.
 Prokinesis; a joint in the facial area, such as modern snakes and birds. This is seen in a variety of dinosaurs.
Some show a combination of the two, such as streptostyly and prokinesis (Shuvuuia). Many, on the other hand, have at various points been thought to show akinesis, such as sauropods, ankylosaurs, and ceratopsians. It can be very difficult to prove that skulls were akinetic, and many of the above examples are contentious.

Pleurokinesis in ornithopods
Pleurokinesis refers to the complex multiple jointing thought to occur in ornithopods, such as hadrosaurs. Ornithopod jaws are isognathic (meet simultaneously), working like a guillotine to slice plant material which can be manipulated with their teeth. However, because of the wedge shape of their teeth, the occlusional plane is tilted away from the centre of the head, causing the jaws to lock together and, due to the lack of a secondary palate, the force of this would not be braced. Because of this, Norman and Weishampel proposed a pleurokinetic skull. Here, there are four (or perhaps even more) kinetic parts of the skull,
 Maxillojugal Unit
 Dentary-predentary
 Quadratojugal
 Quadrate
As the lower jaw closes, the maxillojugal units move laterally producing a power stroke. These motions were later proved by a microwear analysis on an Edmontosaurus jaw.

Birds
Birds show a vast range of cranial kinetic hinges in their skulls. Zusi recognised three basic forms of cranial kinesis in birds,
 Prokinesis, where the upper beak moves at the point where it is hinged with the bird's skull
 Amphikinesis. Unlike prokinesis, the narial openings extend back almost to the level of the craniofacial hinge, and the dorsal and ventral bars are flexible near the symphysis. In addition, the lateral bar is flexible near its junction with the dorsal bar. As a result, protraction and retraction forces are transmitted primarily to the symphysis via the lateral and ventral bars. During protraction the entire upper jaw is raised and the tip of the jaw is bent up in addition; in retraction the tip bends down with respect to the rest of the upper jaw.
 Rhynchokinesis (see below)
Rhynchokinesis is further subdivided into double, distal, proximal, central and extensive. The older terms "schizorhynal" and "holorhynal" are generally synonymous with rhynchokinesis. In schizorhinal birds and most rhynchokinetic birds, the presence of two hinge axes at the base of the upper jaw imposes a requirement of bending within the jaw during kinesis. Bending takes different forms according to the number of hinges and their geometric configuration within the upper jaw. Proximal rhynchokinesis and distal rhynchokinesis apparently evolved from double rhynchokinesis by loss of different hinges. Extensive rhynchokinesis is an unusual and probably specialized variant. Kinesis in hummingbirds is still little understood.

Rhynchokinesis 
Rhynchokinesis is an ability possessed by some birds to flex their upper beak or rhinotheca. Rhynchokinesis involves flexing at a point some way along the upper beak - either upwards, in which case the upper beak and lower beak or gnathotheca diverge, resembling a yawn, or downwards, in which case the tips of the beaks remain together while a gap opens up between them at their midpoint.

Unlike prokinesis, which is widespread in birds, rhynchokinesis is only known in cranes, shorebirds, swifts and hummingbirds. The adaptive significance of rhynchokinesis in certain non-probing birds is not yet known. It is hypothesized that the schizorhinal skull in proximally rhynchokinetic birds reflects ancestry, but has no adaptive explanation, in many living species.

Species in which this has been recorded photographically include the following species: short-billed dowitcher, marbled godwit, least sandpiper, common snipe, long-billed curlew, pectoral sandpiper, semipalmated sandpiper, Eurasian oystercatcher and bar-tailed godwit (see Chandler 2002 and external links).

Either prokinesis or some form of rhynchokinesis could be primitive for birds. Rhynchokinesis is not compatible with the presence of teeth in the bending zone of the ventral bar of the upper Jaw, and it probably evolved after their loss. Neognathous rhynchokinesis, however, probably evolved from prokinesis. The evolutionary origin of rhynchokinesis from prokinesis required selection for morphological changes that produced two hinge axes at the base of the upper jaw. Once evolved, the properties of these axes were subject to selection in relation to their effects on kinesis. The various forms of kinesis are hypothesized to have evolved by simple steps. In neognathous birds, prokinesis was probably ancestral to amphikinesis, and amphikinesis to rhynchokinesis in most cases, but prokinesis has also evolved secondarily.

Hares
In hares or "jackrabbits" (but not in their ancestors), there is a suture between regions in the fetal braincase that remains open in the adult, forming what is thought to be an intracranial joint, permitting relative motion between the anterior and posterior part of the braincase. It is thought that this helps absorb the force of impact as the hare strikes the ground.

See also
Snake skull

References
Notes

Bibliography
 A functional and evolutionary analysis of rhynchokinesis in birds by Richard L Zusi, Smithsonian Institution Press, 1984.
 Chandler, Richard (2002) PhotoSpot - Rhynchokinesis in waders British Birds Vol 95 p395

External links
Photographs of birds performing rhynchokinesis can be found here:
  - a short-billed dowitcher
  - a marbled godwit
  - a least sandpiper
A very clear animation of pleurokinesis in Hadrosaurs can be found here:
 

Musculoskeletal system
Skull